Rogue River is a city in Jackson County, Oregon, United States. As of the 2020 census the population was 2,407.

History
The settlement was known as "Woodville" for many years, but was changed to "Rogue River" about 1912. The Woodville post office operated from 1876 until 1912, when the name was changed to Rogue River.

Geography and climate
The city of Rogue River is in western Jackson County, on the north side of the Rogue River. Interstate 5 passes through the south side of the city, running along the north bank of the river. Access is from Exit 48 (Depot Street). I-5 leads west (northbound)  to Grants Pass and southeast  to Medford, the Jackson county seat.

Demographics

2010 census
As of the census of 2010, there were 2,131 people, 1,054 households, and 539 families living in the city. The racial makeup of the city was 93.3% White, 0.8% African American, 1.2% Native American, 0.4% Asian, 2.1% from other races, and 2.2% from two or more races. Hispanic or Latino of any race were 5.3% of the population.

There were 1,054 households, of which 21.9% had children under the age of 18 living with them, 37.6% were married couples living together, 9.7% had a female householder with no husband present, 3.9% had a male householder with no wife present, and 48.9% were non-families. 43.8% of all households were made up of individuals, and 27.4% had someone living alone who was 65 years of age or older. The average household size was 2.02 and the average family size was 2.78.

The median age in the city was 49.3 years. 19.4% of residents were under the age of 18; 6.6% were between the ages of 18 and 24; 20.2% were from 25 to 44; 24.2% were from 45 to 64; and 29.6% were 65 years of age or older. The gender makeup of the city was 46.3% male and 53.7% female.

2000 census
As of the census of 2000, there were 1,847 people, 902 households, and 484 families living in the city. The population density was 903.7 people per square mile (735.2/km). There were 949 housing units at an average density of 978.1 per square mile (377.7/km). The racial makeup of the city was 93.72% White, 0.22% African American, 1.41% Native American, 0.27% Asian, 0.27% Pacific Islander, 1.62% from other races, and 2.49% from two or more races. Hispanic or Latino of any race were 5.09% of the population.

There were 902 households, out of which 19.8% had children under the age of 18 living with them, 41.1% were married couples living together, 9.5% had a female householder with no husband present, and 46.3% were non-families. 41.8% of all households were made up of individuals, and 29.9% had someone living alone who was 65 years of age or older. The average household size was 2.03 and the average family size was 2.74.

In the city, the population was spread out, with 20.0% under the age of 18, 6.1% from 18 to 24, 18.9% from 25 to 44, 21.3% from 45 to 64, and 33.6% who were 65 years of age or older. The median age was 50 years. For every 100 females, there were 79.0 males. For every 100 females age 18 and over, there were 73.8 males.

The median income for a household in the city was $23,419, and the median income for a family was $34,583. Males had a median income of $32,115 versus $20,764 for females. The per capita income for the city was $16,789. About 9.9% of families and 13.1% of the population were below the poverty line, including 12.5% of those under age 18 and 6.2% of those age 65 or over.

Points of interest 
 Palmerton Arboretum

Media
Rogue River is served by the weekly Rogue River Press.

Notable residents
Ed Mensor, Major League Baseball player

References

External links
City of Rogue River official website
Entry for Rogue River in the Oregon Blue Book

 
Cities in Jackson County, Oregon
Rogue River (Oregon)
1876 establishments in Oregon
Populated places established in 1876
Cities in Oregon